Garry Cruz is a Filipino singer, recording artist, songwriter, vocal coach and vocal arranger. Aside from his singing career he is also a dancer and has a background in acting. Cruz finished his studies in college and majored  in accounting. He was also an elected official at the Sanguniang Kabataan as councilor in their Barangay during his teen years. Some of Garry Cruz's songs on his first album include Kung Alam Mo lang, and Kahit Mali Ang Puso.  His acoustic version of Walang Yaman, Mas Hihigit Sa'yo is used as a soundtrack of the GMA7 action fantasy drama series Asian Treasures. In 2016 he released a new album on digital format. His current self-titled album Garry Cruz includes songs composed by Vehnee Saturno.

Biography
Gerardo "Garry" Canlas Cruz was born at the Jose Fabella Memorial Hospital in Manila. His mother Margarita Canlas and his father Carlos Cruz have four children of whom he is the youngest. Raised in a small Barangay in Navotas Cruz studied at St. Paul Grade school for his Kindergarten and continued his elementary education at Gov. Andres Pascual College. He finished High School at Jose Rizal HS now Elisa Esguerra Arellano University and graduated at The University of The East Caloocan Campus where he took up accountancy. He became a member of his school choir.  Aside from doing demos for various composers, Cruz was also a vocal coach and back-up singer for other aspiring and professional artists. He also entered into politics for a five-year office as SK Kagawad. After finishing school, he immediately pursued his dream to become a recording artist.

Career
Cruz started as a session artist for multiplex tape and videoke CD's. He eventually become a demo artist for composers and a backup singer for some popular artists. He then auditioned for Polycosmic Koocooz, an in house all male singing and dancing group that was a rival to the Universal Motion Dancers (UMD). The group did not last long and disbanded without releasing an album. Cruz went back to being a solo singer. He worked with well known composers and artists and that paved the way for him to become a vocal coach. He also landed some bit roles in films and television.

Finally, he signed his first record deal after a DJ played his demo track of Bong Fernandez's composition entitled Kung Alam Mo Lang on the radio and it became an instant hit. Fernandez said that a lot of singers expressed their interest for that song but he only wanted Cruz to sing it. BMG Records Pilipinas (later Sony BMG Music Philippines) called him up and signed him right away for a solo  album, along with Fernandez, prominent songwriters Lito Camo and Edwin Marollano also wrote a song and Albert Tamayo as the musical arranger to come up with an album entitled Kung Alam Mo Lang.

Since then, Cruz has toured the Philippines and abroad. He went to Hong Kong for a concert then had an extensive tour of the US and Australia With Imelda Papin. He represented the Philippines in Taiwan together with other delegates for a song writing competition as an interpreter and won as Best Singer. Megaworld International hired him to entertain their guests with Filipino songs in Singapore.

In 2016, he released a new album under BellHaus Entertainment Inc. and  produced by Jeffrey Tan, the son of the Late Bella Tan. All the songs in the album are composed by Vehnee Saturno.

Movies

Album

Television

Awards and Accolades

See also
Imelda Papin
Francis Magalona

References

21st-century Filipino male singers
Living people
20th-century Filipino male singers
Year of birth missing (living people)